Hrib pri Hinjah is a small settlement just east of Hinje in the Municipality of Žužemberk in southeastern Slovenia. The area is part of the historical region of Lower Carniola. The municipality is now included in the Southeast Slovenia Statistical Region.

References

External links
Hrib pri Hinjah at Geopedia

Populated places in the Municipality of Žužemberk